Ange is a French progressive rock band.

Ange or Anges may also refer to:

Places
 Angé, Loir-et-Cher department, France, a commune
 Ånge Municipality, Västernorrland County, Sweden
 Ånge, the seat of Ånge Municipality
 Änge, Jämtland County, Sweden, a locality
 Ange (river), Ain, France

People
 Ange (given name), a list of people with the given name or nickname
 Anges Ngapy (born 1963), Congolese former footballer
 Francesco Ange (1675-1757), Italian painter

Arts and entertainment
Les Anges (film) (fr), French 1973 film
Les Anges (TV series), French 2011 reality TV series
Anges (album), by Shunichi Miyamoto
 Ange Ushiromiya, a character from the 07th Expansion visual novel Umineko When They Cry

Other uses
 Ange, a gold coin first issued in France in 1340; see Angel (coin)
 Ånge IF, a Swedish football club based in Ånge, Västernorrland County
Anges FC, a Togolese football club based in Notsé

See also

 Angie (disambiguation)
 Angel (disambiguation)

French-language surnames